Miha Fontaine (born January 3, 2004) is a Canadian freestyle skier who competes internationally in the aerials discipline. He is the son of former Aerials world champion Nicolas Fontaine.

Career
Fontaine joined the national team in 2019. In early 2022, along with fellow aerialist Émile Nadeau, Fontaine started to introduce more complex tricks into his routines to improve and consistency in his placements. This led to a sixth-place finish at the Deer Valley stop of the World Cup.

Winter Olympics medalist
On January 24, 2022 Fontaine was named to Canada's 2022 Olympic team. At the games, Fontaine was a part of Canada's bronze medal winning mixed aerials team.

References

External links 
 

2004 births
Living people
People from Magog, Quebec
Canadian male freestyle skiers
Sportspeople from Quebec
Freestyle skiers at the 2022 Winter Olympics
Olympic freestyle skiers of Canada
Medalists at the 2022 Winter Olympics
Olympic bronze medalists for Canada
Olympic medalists in freestyle skiing